Kenneth B. Duggan (born February 21, 1963) is a Canadian retired professional ice hockey defenceman who played in one National Hockey League game for the Minnesota North Stars during the 1987–88 season, on January 24, 1988 against the Philadelphia Flyers. The rest of his career, which lasted from 1986 to 1989, was mainly spent in the minor leagues.

Career statistics

Regular season and playoffs

See also
 List of players who played only one game in the NHL

External links
 

1963 births
Living people
Canadian ice hockey defencemen
Flint Spirits players
Ice hockey people from Ontario
Minnesota North Stars players
New Haven Nighthawks players
Sportspeople from London, Ontario
Toronto Varsity Blues ice hockey players
Undrafted National Hockey League players